Johnny Maroney is President and founder of music management company Moodswing. Founded in 2007 as a Touring & Marketing Agency; known for launching the careers of artist LMFAO, Iggy Azalea. Far East Movement, DEV, Das Racist, RiFF RaFF, & Shawyze; and representing icons Tommy Lee, Dave Navarro, Pete Wentz, Travis McCoy;  in addition to consulting for various record labels and brands.

In 2014, Moodswing changed focus from agency-based work to artist management and music partnerships focused on supporting emerging cultural sounds.

Early career
While at Marist College, Maroney launched a late-night radio show focused on underground and import dance music called Afterhours on K104, which aired Saturday nights/Sunday mornings 2–4 a.m. weekly for seven years, on WSPK, from 1998 to 2005.  After graduation from college, Maroney began his career in music & marketing working at Track Marketing Group (Pepsi Smash, Rolling Rock Town Fair, Clubplanet, Wanttickets) and contributing to the development of Track Central Booking agency division, which represented dance music artists Junior Vasquez, Skribble, Hex Hector, Crooklyn Clan, Fatman Scoop, Jonathan Peters and more.

2014 to present
In 2014 Maroney formed partnership with Moodswing and Crush Music for artist management. 
2015 Maroney formed a music distribution partnership with Caroline Distribution.

References

Year of birth missing (living people)
Living people
American music industry executives
Marist College alumni